Zahed (Zahid) is an Arabic, Iranian, and Indian male name that means ascetic. Notable people with the name include:

Given name 
Zahed Gilani (1216–1301) Iranian Grandmaster of the famed Zahediyeh Sufi order in Lahijan.
Zahed Mohamed (born 1992) Egyptian professional squash player.
Zahed Sultan, Kuwaiti multimedia artist, culture producer, filmmaker.

Family name 

 Ataollah Zahed (1915–1991) Iranian actor, filmmaker

See also

 Zahid

References 

Arabic masculine given names

